Alain Santy (born August 28, 1949) is a former French professional cyclist.

Biography
He is the brother of Guy Santy, who was also a professional cyclist. Santy was professional from 1970 to 1976. He had 10 wins as a professional. His most important victory was the first place of the Critérium du Dauphiné in 1974.

Major results

1972
1st Criterium d'Aix-en-Provence
1973
1st Overall Tour de Picardie
1974
1st Paris–Camembert
1st Overall Critérium du Dauphiné
1st Stage 4
1975
1st Stages 2 & 4 Étoile de Bessèges
1st Le Samyn

Results in the Tour de France
1972: DNF
1973: 31st
1974: 9th
1975: DNF

References

1949 births
Living people
French male cyclists